is a Japanese composer and arranger. He has composed the scores for many anime series, including Inuyasha, D.Gray-man, Saint Seiya: The Lost Canvas, Samurai 7 and, more recently, Tesla Note.

He also became known to the West through his arranged works for orchestra and piano in video games like Kingdom Hearts and Kingdom Hearts II.

Wada, along with other later-famous musicians, studied at the Tokyo College of Music under Akira Ifukube and Sei Ikeno. He is also an apprentice of the famed Godzilla composer, Akira Ifukube. He is married to Inuyasha voice actress Akiko Nakagawa, who voices Sota Higurashi in that anime.

Works

Anime

Video games

References

External links
 
 Discography at VGMdb
 
 
 Kaoru Wada search results at Media Arts Database 
 Kaoru Wada at Oricon
 
 Interview at RocketBaby

1962 births
Anime composers
Inuyasha
Japanese classical composers
Japanese film score composers
Japanese male classical composers
Japanese male film score composers
Japanese music arrangers
Kingdom Hearts
Living people
Musicians from Yamaguchi Prefecture
People from Shimonoseki
Super Sentai